Cracking Up is a 1983 American comedy film directed by and starring Jerry Lewis, his last film as a director and last film for Warner Bros. Originally titled Smorgasbord, it was filmed in 1981 and 1982 and only received limited distribution in the United States. Lewis wrote the screenplay with Bill Richmond, his writing collaborator on films such as The Nutty Professor and The Patsy.

The film contains a series of short comic sketches, set pieces and blackout gags.

Plot
Warren Nefron is a klutz who cannot do anything right. He tells his problems to his psychiatrist, Dr. Pletchick. Through a series of flashbacks Nefron's life story is told.

Warren is such a failure that even his many attempts to commit suicide fail. Dr. Pletchick cures Warren with hypnosis, but all of Nefron's problems get transferred to him as a result.

Warren and a young woman attend a film titled Smorgasbord (the film's original title).

Cast
 Jerry Lewis as Warren
 Herb Edelman as the Psychiatrist
 Zane Buzby as the Waitress
 Milton Berle as the Lady (voiced by Ruta Lee)
 Foster Brooks as the Pilot
 Dick Butkus as Anti-Smoking Enforcer
 Francine York as Marie
 Sammy Davis, Jr. as himself
 Buddy Lester as Passenger

Production
Cracking Up includes many cameos, including those of Sammy Davis Jr., Dick Butkus and Milton Berle. In December 1982 after filming completed, Lewis underwent triple-bypass heart surgery at Desert Springs Hospital in Las Vegas.

Release
The film was released theatrically in some European countries, such as France (where it was released on April 13, 1983 by Warner Bros.), Belgium and Italy. It was given a limited release in American theatres: it was given a test release in Wichita, Kansas, on April 22, 1983, under its original Smorgasbord title, then in Tucson, Arizona, on September 2, 1983, under its new title Cracking Up. In early 1984, it premiered on cable television, initially on the PRISM channel, and on videocassette. In May 1985, it was given a two-day run at New York's Thalia Theater under its original title, double-billed with The King of Comedy. It later played a smattering of revival houses, art cinemas and film festivals. The film was screened as part of the Jerry Lewis: The Total Filmmaker program at the 2016 Melbourne International Film Festival.

Reception
In a contemporary review for The New York Times, critic Vincent Canby called the film "a mostly cold buffet of random Lewis routines in which the director-star falls off slippery furniture, cracks up automobiles, fails at suicide and can't even walk across the floor of his psychiatrist's office without taking a header."

Home media 
Warner Home Video released the film on VHS and Beta on January 4, 1984, touting it as a unique exclusive premiere to home video, disregarding its brief theatrical run.

Warner Archive released the film on DVD on May 18, 2010.

References

External links

1983 comedy films
1983 films
Films directed by Jerry Lewis
Films with screenplays by Jerry Lewis
Films with screenplays by Bill Richmond (writer)
1980s English-language films
American comedy films
1980s American films